The Warroad River is a river of Lake of the Woods.  It has its mouth in the city of Warroad, Minnesota.  The river is formed at the confluence of the East and West Branches Warroad Rivers, south of the city of Warroad, Minnesota.

See also
List of rivers of Minnesota

References

External links
Minnesota Watersheds
USGS Hydrologic Unit Map - State of Minnesota (1974)

Rivers of Minnesota
Rivers of Roseau County, Minnesota